Patria Bank S.A. is a Romanian bank based in Bucharest, resulting from the 2017 reverse merger between Banca Comercială Carpatica and Patria Bank (known as Nextebank until 2016), which saw the latter being absorbed into the former, with its name and brand being adopted by the restructured company.

References

See also

 List of banks in Romania

Banks of Romania
Banks established in 1999
1999 establishments in Romania